The 1977 Star World Championships were held in Kiel, Germany in 1977.

Results

References

Star World Championships
1977 in sailing
Sailing competitions in West Germany